George Van Horn Moseley (September 28, 1874 – November 7, 1960) was a United States Army general. Following his retirement in 1938, he became controversial for his fiercely anti-immigrant and antisemitic views.

Early life and career

Moseley was born in Evanston, Illinois, on September 28, 1874. He graduated from the United States Military Academy in 1899 and was commissioned second lieutenant in the cavalry. He served in the Philippines twice, from 1900 to 1903 and 1906 to 1907, where his assignments included commanding a troop of the 1st Cavalry and serving as Aide-de-Camp to Generals J. M. Bell and J. M. Lee. In 1901 Moseley, accompanied by only one other officer, without escort and under conditions of great danger, penetrated a major Philippine insurgent stronghold. 2nd Lt. Moseley and 1st Lt. George Curry convinced Brigadier General Ludovico Arejola to sign the peace agreement in Taban, Minalabac (Philippines) on March 25, 1901.

The honor graduate of the Army School of the Line in 1908, Moseley also graduated from the Army Staff College in 1909 and the Army War College in 1911. During World War I, Moseley served as assistant chief of staff for logistics (G-4) on the staff of the American Expeditionary Force headquarters.

Moseley married Mrs. Florence DuBois in July 1930.

Moseley held camp and Washington assignments from 1920–1929. He was a member of several important commissions, including the Harbord Commission to investigate Armenian issues. After commanding the Second Field Artillery Brigade, in 1921 he was detailed as assistant to General Dawes in organizing the newly created Bureau of the Budget. In 1921 he was promoted brigadier general, Regular Army. Commanding the 1st Cavalry Division (1927–1929), he successfully interceded, under fire, with principals in a 1929 Mexican insurrection. His actions stopped stray gunfire from Juarez, Mexico, from endangering life and property in adjacent El Paso, Texas, and precluded further incidents. In 1931 he was promoted major general, Regular Army.

Senior assignments
Moseley was the executive for the Assistant Secretary of War, from 1929 to 1930 and Deputy Chief of Staff of Army from 1930 to 1933. He served as General Douglas MacArthur's Deputy Chief of Staff during the 1932 Bonus March on Washington, D.C., in the course of which he recorded his fears of a Communist conspiracy against the United States and his identification of Jews with radicals and undesirables. He wrote in a private letter:

In 1934, Moseley asked MacArthur to consider the immigration issue in terms of military manpower, contrasting a group of "southern lads" of "good Anglo-Saxon stock" with their counterparts from the North with names "difficult to pronounce" that "indicated foreign blood". Moseley linked the latter to labor problems and "so much trouble in our schools and colleges." MacArthur expressed skepticism in response to Moseley's argument that "It is a question of whether or not the old blood that built this fine nation ... is to continue to administer that nation, or whether that old stock is going to be destroyed or bred out by a lot of foreign blood which the melting pot has not touched."

Moseley was commanding general of the 5th Corps Area, from 1933 to 1934 and 4th Corps Area from 1934 to 1936.  His final assignment was as commander of the Third United States Army from 1936 to 1938.

Controversy
While still on active service, Moseley expressed controversial opinions in public. In 1936, he proposed that the Civilian Conservation Corps be expanded "to take in every 18-year-old youth in the country for a six-month course in work, education and military training." In the late 1930s, when admitting refugees from Nazi persecution was a matter of national controversy, Moseley supported admitting refugees but added the proviso "that they all be sterilized before being permitted to embark. Only that way can we properly protect our future."

Retirement
Moseley retired from the Army in October 1938 with a statement that described the New Deal as a growing dictatorship: "We do not have to vote for a dictatorship to have one in America ... We have merely to vote increased government responsibility for our individual lives, increased government authority over our daily habits, and the resultant Federal paternalism will inevitably become dictatorship." Secretary of War Harry Woodring called his statement "flagrantly disloyal." In April 1939 he attacked Jews and said that he foresaw a war fought for their benefit. He attacked President Franklin D. Roosevelt for appointing Felix Frankfurter to the U.S. Supreme Court. He predicted that the U.S. Army would not follow the orders of FDR's leftist administration if they "violate all American tradition." He described fascism and nazism as good "antitoxins" for the United States, adding that "the finest type of Americanism can breed under their protection as they neutralize the efforts of the Communists."  Moseley understood that as a retired general, he remained subject to the War Department's jurisdiction, writing to a friend:  "The only good I can do now is in keeping up quite a large correspondence with men who are in a position to influence public affairs. The enemy has completely silenced me, and I am handicapped, as I am still a Government official." Moseley also tried to lobby the New York National Guard adjutant to "cleanse" the state forces of all Jews and persons of color.

Time reported his view that "more money should be spent on syphilis prevention and less on national defense" Two months after leaving the military, he questioned the President's proposed increases in military spending: "Much of our present weakness is in the fear and hysteria being engendered among the American people for ... political purpose. ... A nation so scared and so burdened financially is not in a condition to lick anybody. And then, who in hell are we afraid of? With Japan absorbed ... with the balance of power so nearly equal in Europe, where is there an ounce of naval or military strength free to threaten us?" He became increasingly more outspoken and instead of the language of Social Darwinism expressed anti-Semitic and conspiratorial views overtly. In Philadelphia, he told the National Defense Meeting that Jewish bankers had financed the Russian Revolution and that "The war now proposed is for the purposes of establishing Jewish hegemony throughout the world." He said that Jews controlled the media and might soon control the federal government.

In June 1939, Moseley testified for five hours before the House Un-American Activities Committee. He said that a Jewish Communist conspiracy was about to seize control of the U.S. government. He believed the President had the authority to counteract the planned coup and could do so "in five minutes" by issuing an order "to discharge every Communist in the government and everyone giving aid and comfort to the Communists." He said the President could use the Army against "the enemy within our gates" but did not seem willing to do so. He said he held no anti-Semitic views and that "the Jew is an internationalist first ... and a patriot second." He praised the "impressively patriotic" German-American Bund and said its purpose was to "see that Communists don't take over the country." Among Moseley's supporters who attended the hearing were Donald Shea, head of the American Gentile League and James True of America First Inc. The Committee found a prepared statement he read into the record so objectionable it was deleted from the public record. A few days later, Thomas E. Stone, head of the Council of United States Veterans, accused Moseley of treason and wrote that his praise of the Bund "abets a foreign government in the preparation of disruption against the eventuality of possible future hostilities, and that this he is acting in treason to our national safety."

Moseley held anti-immigrant views throughout his life. In his unpublished autobiography, he quoted approvingly from Madison Grant's The Passing of the Great Race. He used the language of Social Darwinism to describe the problem the United States faced:

Moseley described the Jew as a permanent "human outcast." They were "crude and unclean, animal-like things ... something loathsome, such as syphilis." Following the Nazi invasion of France he wrote that in order to match the Nazi threat, the U.S. needed to launch a program of "selective breeding, sterilization, the elimination of the unfit, and the elimination of those types which are inimical to the general welfare of the nation." In December 1941, Moseley wrote that Europe's Jews were "receiving their just punishment for the crucifixion of Christ ... whom they are still crucifying at every turn of the road." He proposed a "worldwide policy which will result in bleeding all Jewish blood out of the human race."

Shortly after the December 7, 1941, attack on Pearl Harbor, Moseley wrote to former president Herbert Hoover alleging that a conspiracy of the British government and Jews in the United States goaded Japan to make war on the United States.

In 1947, Moseley said of his years as a West Point cadet, "there was one Jew in my class, a very undesirable creature, who was soon eliminated."  In the 1950s he became a critic of the Eisenhower Administration and championed the rehabilitation of convicted Nazi war criminal, Karl Doenitz.

In 1951, the president of Piedmont College in Georgia invited Moseley to speak. Students and faculty protested because of his racist views. TIME called him a "trumpeter for Aryan supremacy." One faculty member was fired for speaking in opposition to the speaking engagement. Calls for the president's resignation followed. Almost the entire faculty and 9 trustees resigned in the next two years and enrollment fell by two thirds.

In 1959, Moseley was one of the founders of Americans for Constitutional Action, an anti-Semitic successor to America First.

In retirement Moseley lived at the Atlanta Biltmore Hotel in Atlanta, Georgia. He died in Atlanta from a heart attack on November 7, 1960, and was buried at West Point Cemetery. Although he had disappeared from the public's view, he continued to influence a generation of other officers, including Albert Wedemeyer who shared similar bigoted beliefs.  According to Professor Joshua Kastenberg at the University of New Mexico, prior to the January 6, 2021 attack on the United States Capitol in Washington D.C., Moseley was the most extreme example of a retired officer seeking to subvert the Constitution.

Awards
Moseley's awards included the Army Distinguished Service Medal (one oak leaf cluster); Commander of the Order of the Crown (Belgium); Companion of the Order of the Bath (United Kingdom); Commander of the Legion of Honor and Croix de Guerre with Palm (France); and Commander of the Order of the Crown of Italy. He was also a recipient of the Philippine Campaign Medal, Mexican Service Medal and the World War I Victory Medal.

Family
Moseley had three sons. He married Alice Dodds in 1902 and married Florence DuBois in July 1930. Alice was mother to George & Francis, Florence was mother to James.
 Colonel George Van Horn Moseley Jr. led the 502d Parachute Infantry Regiment into Normandy in 1944.
 Francis L. Moseley was an inventor and Vice President at the Hewlett-Packard Company.
 James W. Moseley was a longstanding figure in the UFO enthusiast community.

Notes

Sources
 Bendersky, Joseph W., The Jewish Threat (Basic Books, 2002)
 James, D. Clayton, The Years of MacArthur, vol. 1: 1880–1941 (Boston: Houghton Mifflin, 1970)
 Smith, Richard Norton, An Uncommon Man: The Triumph of Herbert Hoover (NY: Simon & Schuster, 1981)
 Weintraub, Stanley, 15 Stars: Eisenhower, MacArthur, Marshall, Three Generals Who Saved the American Century (NY: Simon & Schuster, 2007)
 Kastenberg, Joshua E., "The Crisis of June 202:  The Case of the Retired General and Admirals and the Clarion Calls of their Critics in Lex Non Scripta (Historic) Perspective", 99 University of Nebraska Law Review, 594, 610 (2021)

External links

 United States Third Army biography 
 George Van Horn Moseley papers at Library of Congress
 Finding Aid

1874 births
1960 deaths
United States Army Cavalry Branch personnel
American conspiracy theorists
American white supremacists
Commanders of the Order of the Crown (Belgium)
Military personnel from Illinois
Old Right (United States)
People from Evanston, Illinois
Recipients of the Distinguished Service Medal (US Army)
United States Army generals of World War I
United States Army generals
United States Army War College alumni
United States Military Academy alumni
American anti-communists
United States Army Command and General Staff College alumni
Burials at West Point Cemetery